Toni Rocak (born 22 April 1999) is a Swiss basketball player.

Personal and early life
Rocak's family has Croatian roots. Toni and his brother Niko owe their heights to their father Ante, a former European karate champion who became an owner of a fitness company and a basketball sponsor. The family moved from Geneva, Switzerland to Zug for professional reasons. Here the brothers attended the International School of Zug and Luzern (ISZL) where they played basketball for the school team. 

The website swisshopes.ch listed Toni as the country's second best basketball prospect for players born in 1999. 

In March 2017, the Swiss newspaper Luzerner Zeitung labelled Toni Rocak and his brother Niko as being "among the most talented basketball players of their year." 

Rocak speaks German, English, French and Croatian. He stated that in addition to athletic development, it is also important to him to achieve something academically.

Club career
In 2017 he had short assignment with Swiss Central Basket of the Swiss Basketball League.

College career
Rocak spent a high school year in the US before he joined his college team.

National team 
Alongside his brother, he played for Switzerland's U16 and U18 national teams. 

He later became a member of the Swiss national basketball team.

References

External links
UC San Diego Tritons bio
Toni Rocak at Eurobasket.com
FIBA profile 
Toni Rocak at RealGM.com

1999 births
Living people
Forwards (basketball)
People from Zug
Sportspeople from the canton of Zug
Regis Rangers men's basketball players
Sportspeople from Geneva
Swiss expatriate sportspeople in the United States
Swiss men's basketball players
Swiss people of Croatian descent
UC San Diego Tritons men's basketball players